Sara Badr (born June 27, 1987 in Alexandria) is a professional squash player who represented Egypt. She reached a career-high world ranking of World No. 65 in February 2004. She is currently a marketing professional at Microsoft in the UAE.

References

External links 

Egyptian female squash players
Living people
1987 births
21st-century Egyptian women